Trigonopterus alaspurwensis is a species of flightless weevil in the genus Trigonopterus from Indonesia.

Etymology
The species is named after the Alas Purwo National Park, where it was discovered.

Description
The holotype measured 3.47mm long.  General coloration is a lustrous coppery green, with a black band running transversely across the elytra.  Head and legs are rust-colored.

Range

References

aeneomicans
Beetles described in 2014
Beetles of Asia